The City of Dandenong was a local government area about  southeast of Melbourne, the state capital of Victoria, Australia.

History

Dandenong was part of the Shire of Dandenong, which was first incorporated in 1857 as a road district, and became a shire in 1873. On 31 May 1955, the new Shire of Dandenong was separately incorporated, while the original Shire of Dandenong was renamed Springvale and Noble Park. On 14 May 1959, Dandenong was proclaimed a city.

On 15 December 1994, the City of Dandenong was abolished, and along with parts of the Cities of Berwick, Cranbourne and Springvale, was merged into the newly created City of Greater Dandenong.

Council meetings were held at the Town Hall, at the corner of Lonsdale Street and Walker Street, Dandenong, but most city business was conducted at the city offices in Clow Street, two blocks away. Both locations are still used by the City of Greater Dandenong for their original purpose.

Wards

The City of Dandenong was subdivided into four wards, each electing three councillors:
 North West Ward
 North East Ward
 Centre Ward
 South West Ward

Suburbs
 Dandenong*
 Dandenong North
 Dandenong South (shared with the City of Cranbourne)
 Keysborough (shared with the City of Springvale)
 Noble Park (shared with the City of Springvale)
 Noble Park North (shared with the City of Springvale)

* Council seat.

Population

* Estimate in the 1958 Victorian Year Book.

References

External links
 Victorian Places - Dandenong Shire and City

Dandenong
1955 establishments in Australia
City of Greater Dandenong
1994 disestablishments in Australia